Marianne Davies (1743 or 1744 – c. 1818) was an English musician, and the sister of the classical soprano Cecilia Davies. She was a singer who also played flute and harpsichord.

In 1762 she became the first person to publicly perform on the glass harmonica (also known as the armonica), an instrument consisting of variously sized and tuned glass bowls that rotate on a common shaft, played by touching the spinning glass with wet fingers. She toured in concerts with her sister, performing in Dublin (1763), London, and on the Continent where the two girls became acquainted with the Mozart family. Beethoven also composed music for the instrument.

She corresponded regularly with Benjamin Franklin, who invented the instrument. Various correspondence in the historical archives outlines her failing health, and her desire to have the opportunity to play the instrument again before her death.

References

External links 
Her correspondence is published on William Zeitler's website.
 Biography at "Glassarmonica"
 About the glassharmonica, many pictures, videos, history, discography and works on glassharmonicist virtuoso Thomas Bloch website
 Biography

English classical musicians
Year of birth unknown
Year of death unknown
Year of birth uncertain
1740s births
1810s deaths